Geisha Stakes is an American Thoroughbred horse race held annually in April since 1973 primarily at Pimlico Race Course in Baltimore or at Laurel Park Racecourse in Laurel. To be eligible for the Geisha Handicap, a horse must be bred in Maryland. Due to that restriction the race is classified as a non-graded or "listed" stakes race and is not eligible for grading by the American Graded Stakes Committee.

In 2012 the Geisha Stakes is run at one mile. The race was run at  miles for its first 30 years in existence from 1973–2003. The race was run on the turf one year in 1988.

In its 39th running in 2010, the race was named in honor of Alfred G. Vanderbilt's Geisha, a Maryland-bred daughter of Discovery and bred by John P. Grier. She was foaled at the famed Sagamore Farm in Glyndon, Maryland in 1943. She was bred to Preakness Stakes winner Polynesian and produced Native Dancer in 1950, one of the greatest race horses and sires of the 20th century.

Records 

Speed record: 
  miles (8.5 furlongs) : 1:42.20 – Any Spray (1984)
  miles (9 furlongs) : 1:51.40 – Prominade Girl (2004)

Most wins by an owner:
 4 – Stephen Quick  (2004, 2007, 2008 & 2009)

Most wins by a jockey:
 4 – William J. Passmore   (1974, 1975, 1976 and 1980)

Most wins by a trainer:
 4 – Christopher W. Grove  (2004, 2007, 2008 & 2009)

Winners of the Geisha Stakes

See also 
 Geisha Handicap top three finishers

References

 Maryland Thoroughbred official website

Horse races in Maryland
Restricted stakes races in the United States
Pimlico Race Course
Laurel Park Racecourse
Recurring sporting events established in 1973
1973 establishments in Maryland